Jan Mertens may refer to:
 Jan Mertens the Younger (died c. 1527), was a South Netherlandish painter, son of the sculptor Jan Mertens the Elder
 Jan Mertens (Catholic People's Party) (1916–2000), Dutch politician
 Jan Mertens (cyclist) (1904–1964), Belgian cyclist
 Jan Mertens (footballer) (born 1995), Belgian footballer